Frankie Miller's Double Take is the eleventh studio album by Scottish singer-songwriter Frankie Miller. It was released on 30 September 2016 by Universal Music.

Background 
After almost thirty years in the music business, Frankie Miller suffered a brain haemorrhage in 1994 which resulted in him being unable to speak or sing.

The album's producer David Mackay began working on the album after Rod Stewart asked if he was in possession of any of Miller's unreleased songs. Mackay contacted Miller's wife, who sent him "two sacks full of demos".

On 12 August 2016, a trailer for the album was published on Miller's Facebook page. In the video, David Mackay states that his idea to invite other artists to feature on the album came from the fact that Miller would not be able to promote the album himself as he cannot perform. "I found more and more artists loved Frankie Miller, and they were just ready to drop everything and come and sing on a track."

Singles 
On 9 August 2016, "It Gets Me Blue" with Paul Carrack was released as the lead single.

Track listing

Charts

References 

 

2016 albums
Vocal duet albums
Frankie Miller albums